The 1999 South Tyneside Metropolitan Borough Council election took place on 6 May 1999 to elect members of South Tyneside Metropolitan Borough Council in Tyne and Wear, England. One third of the council was up for election and the Labour Party kept overall control of the council.

After the election, the composition of the council was:
Labour 51
Liberal Democrat 6
Progressives 3

Election result
The results saw no change with Labour remaining firmly in control with 51 of the 60 seats on the council. In Hebburn Quay ward 3 recounts were required before the sitting Liberal Democrat councillor, Catherine Tolson, was re-elected by 20 votes. Overall turnout in the election was 25.4%.

References

1999
1999 English local elections
20th century in Tyne and Wear